Putting the River in Reverse is a 2006 documentary film about the first major recording session in New Orleans, United States, following Hurricane Katrina. It features Elvis Costello and Allen Toussaint. It was directed by Matthew Buzzell and premiered at the 2006 Full Frame Documentary Film Festival.  It also played at the 2006 Tribeca Film Festival.

External links

Documentary films about music and musicians
Documentary films about Hurricane Katrina
American documentary films
2006 films
2006 documentary films
2000s American films